London Buses route 281 is a Transport for London contracted bus route in London, England. Running between Hounslow and Tolworth, it is operated by London United using 25 buses.

History

Route 281 was introduced between Twickenham and Tolworth on 9 May 1962 to replace trolleybus route 601, operating from Fulwell garage. On 15 August 1981 it was converted from AEC Routemaster to MCW Metrobus operation.

In 2000, the route was identified as one of the most popular in London, with approximately 5.5 million passengers using the service that year.

On 3 June 2006, route 281 became the 100th night bus service in London, when a 24-hour service introduced. It replaced a portion of route N22, which was shortened to end at Fulwell.

Since the privatisation of London bus services, it has always been operated by London United out of Fulwell garage.

Current route
Route 281 operates via these main locations:
Hounslow bus station 
Hounslow station 
Whitton Admiral Nelson, Nelson Road
Twickenham Stadium
Twickenham station 
Twickenham King Street
Twickenham Green Prince Albert, Hampton Road
Fulwell station  (250m west)
Teddington High Street
Hampton Wick station 
Kingston Wood Street
Kingston Cromwell Road bus station  for Kingston station  (southbound)
Kingston station  (northbound)
Kingston University
Surbiton station 
Tolworth

Incidents
In July 2005, shortly after the 7 July 2005 London bombings, the route was the subject of a hoax bomb threat.

References

External links

Bus routes in London
Transport in the London Borough of Hounslow
Transport in the Royal Borough of Kingston upon Thames
Transport in the London Borough of Richmond upon Thames